The National Alliance for Development and Democracy (AND) is a political alliance in Benin. Its current president is Valentin Aditi Houde and is supportive of the Yayi Boni government.

History
The AND was formed on 31 May 2014, as an alliance of 17 parties. It received 7.6% of the vote in the  2015 parliamentary elections, winning five seats.

Member parties
Member parties include:
Citizen's Union for the Homeland
Democratic Rally of Benin
Forces of Progress
Mission of Young Patriots for Development
Mobilisation of United Forces for Development
Movement for the Republic and Ethics
Movement of Reflection and Action for Development
Movement for Democracy and Solidarity
Mouvement La Conscience Missité
Party of Renovation for Solidarity and Progress
Rally for a United Benin
Rally for Progress and Renewal
Sentinel of the Republic
Union for Work and Democracy
Union of Democratic Forces for Development
Union of Movements and Association of Abomey-Calavi
Vision and Hope for an Emergent Benin

References

Political party alliances in Benin
2014 establishments in Benin
Political parties established in 2014